Protein tyrosine phosphatase, receptor type, C also known as PTPRC is an enzyme that, in humans, is encoded by the PTPRC gene.  PTPRC is also known as CD45 antigen (CD stands for cluster of differentiation), which was originally called leukocyte common antigen (LCA).

Function 

The protein product of this gene, best known as CD45, is a member of the protein tyrosine phosphatase (PTP) family. PTPs are signaling molecules that regulate a variety of cellular processes including cell growth, differentiation, mitotic cycle, and oncogenic transformation. CD45 contains an extracellular domain, a single transmembrane segment, and two tandem intracytoplasmic catalytic domains, and thus belongs to the receptor type PTP family.

CD45 is a type I transmembrane protein that is present in various isoforms on all differentiated hematopoietic cells (except erythrocytes and plasma cells). CD45 has been shown to be an essential regulator of T- and B-cell antigen receptor signaling. It functions through either direct interaction with components of the antigen receptor complexes via its extracellular domain (a form of co-stimulation), or by activating various Src family kinases required for the antigen receptor signaling via its cytoplasmic domain. CD45 also suppresses JAK kinases, and so functions as a  negative regulator of cytokine receptor signaling.

Many alternatively spliced transcripts variants of this gene, which encode distinct isoforms, have been reported. Antibodies against the different isoforms of CD45 are used in routine immunohistochemistry to differentiate between immune cell types, as well as to  differentiate between histological sections from lymphomas and carcinomas.

Isoforms 

The CD45 protein family consists of multiple members that are all products of a single complex gene. This gene contains 34 exons, producing a massive protein with extracellular and cytoplasmic domains that are both unusually large. Exons 4, 5, and 6 (corresponding to protein regions A, B, and C) are alternatively spliced to generate up to eight different protein products featuring combinations of zero, one, two, or all three exons.

CD45's large extracellular domain is highly glycosylated, and these eight isoforms allow wide variation in the structure of its side chains. The isoforms affect the protein's N-terminal region, which extends linearly out from the cell and bears the O-linked glycan chains. 

CD45 isoforms show cell-type and differentiation-stage specific expression, a pattern which is quite well conserved in mammals. These isoforms are often used as markers that identify and distinguish between different types of immune cells.

Naive T lymphocytes are typically positive for CD45RA, which includes only the A protein region. Activated and memory T lymphocytes express CD45RO, the shortest CD45 isoform, which lacks all three of the A, B, and C regions. This shortest isoform facilitates T cell activation.

CD45R (also known as CD45RABC) contains all three possible exons. It is the longest protein and migrates at 200 kDa when isolated from T cells. B cells also express CD45R with heavier glycosylation, bringing the molecular weight to 220 kDa, hence the name B220 (B cell isoform of 220 kDa).

Interactions 

PTPRC has been shown to interact with:
 GANAB,
 LYN, 
 Lck, and
 SKAP1.

CD45 has been recently shown to interact with the HCMV UL11 protein. This interaction results in functional paralysis of T cells. In addition, CD45 was shown to be the target of the species D adenovirus 19a E3/49K protein to inhibit the activation of NK and T cells.

Clinical importance 

CD45 is a pan-leukocyte protein with tyrosine phosphatase activity involved in the regulation of signal transduction in hematopoiesis. CD45 does not colocalize with lipid rafts on murine and human non-transformed hematopoietic cells, but CD45 positioning within lipid rafts is modified during their oncogenic transformation to acute myeloid leukemia. CD45 colocalizes with lipid rafts on AML cells, which contributes to elevated GM-CSF signal intensity involved in proliferation of leukemic cells.

Use as a congenic marker 

There are two identifiable alleles of CD45 in mice: CD45.1 (Ly5.1 historically) and CD45.2 (Ly5.2 historically). These two types of CD45 are believed to be functionally identical.  As such, they are routinely used in scientific research to allow identification of cells.  For instance, leukocytes can be transferred from a CD45.1 donor mouse, into a CD45.2 host mouse, and can be subsequently identified due to their expression of CD45.1.  This technique is also routinely used when generating chimeras.  An alternative system is the use of CD90 (Thy1) alleles, which CD90.1/CD90.2 system is used in the same manner as the CD45.1/CD45.2 system.

In 2016 a new knock-in mouse was generated on the C57Bl/6 background to be a perfect congenic strain. This mouse, dubbed the CD45.1STEM mouse, differs from the C57Bl/6 strain by a single base pair resulting in a single amino acid change that confers the difference in reactivity by the anti-CD45.1 and anti-CD45.2 antibodies. This strain was designed for competitive bone marrow transplantation assays and demonstrated perfect equivalence, unlike the previous standard, the "SJL" mouse, more formally known as Pep Boy.

References

Bibliography

External links 
 

Clusters of differentiation